Francesco Giordani (5 July 1896 – 24 January 1961) was an Italian research chemist and scientist.

Biography
Born in Naples, the son of a municipal engineer, in 1914 Giordani showed his early interest for the sciences releasing a study of aerodynamic in a local scientific journal. In 1918 he graduated in chemistry at the University of Naples and began to devote himself to electrochemistry, particularly focusing his researches on chlor-alkali electrolysis. He is best known as the inventor of the theory of electrolytic diaphragm and the circulation of alkaline chloride, which eventually led to the invention of the Giordani-Pomilio electrolyzer.

After teaching electrochemistry at the Engineering School of Naples, in 1935 Giordani became professor of general and inorganic chemistry in his alma mater, also directing the Chemical Institute of the university. He also founded and directed several scientific institutions, as well as the journal Questioni meridionali.

References

1896 births
1961 deaths
Scientists from Naples
Italian chemists
University of Naples Federico II alumni
Academic staff of the University of Naples Federico II
Knights Commander of the Order of Merit of the Federal Republic of Germany